In political science, a political system means the type of political organization that can be recognized, observed or otherwise declared by a state.

It defines the process for making official government decisions. It usually comprizes the governmental  legal and economic system, social and cultural system, and other state and government specific systems. However, this is a very simplified view of a much more complex system of categories involving the questions of who should have authority and what the government influence on its people and economy should be.

The major types of political systems are democracies, monarchies, and authoritarian and totalitarian regimes with varying hybrid systems.

Definition 
According to David Easton, "A political system can be designated as the interactions through which values are authoritatively allocated for a society".. Political system refers broadly to the process by which laws are made and public resources allocated in a society, and to the relationships among those involved in making these decisions.

Social political science 

The sociological interest in political systems is figuring out who holds power within the relationship between the government and its people and how the government’s power is used. According to Yale professor Juan José Linz there a three main types of political systems today: democracies, 
totalitarian regimes and, sitting between these two, authoritarian regimes (with hybrid regimes). Another modern classification system includes monarchies as a standalone entity or as a hybrid system of the main three. Scholars generally  refer to a dictatorship as either a form of authoritarianism or  totalitarianism.

Democracy

Authoritarianism

Totalitarian

Monarchy

Hybrid

Sociological and socioanthropological classification 

Social anthropologists generally recognize four kinds of political systems, two of which are uncentralized and two of which are centralized.
 Uncentralized systems
 Band society
 Small family group, no larger than an extended family or clan; it has been defined as consisting of no more than 30 to 50 individuals.
 A band can cease to exist if only a small group walks out.
 Tribe
 Generally larger, consisting of many families. Tribes have more social institutions, such as a chief or elders.
 More permanent than bands. Many tribes are sub-divided into bands.
 Centralized governments
 Chiefdom
 More complex than a tribe or a band society, and less complex than a state or a civilization
 Characterized by pervasive inequality and centralization of authority.
 A single lineage/family of the elite class becomes the ruling elite of the chiefdom
 Complex chiefdoms have two or even three tiers of political hierarchy.
 "An autonomous political unit comprising a number of villages or communities under the permanent control of a paramount chief"
 Sovereign state
 A sovereign state is a state with a permanent population, a defined territory, a government and the capacity to enter into relations with other sovereign states.
 Supranational political systems
 Supranational political systems are created by independent nations to reach a common goal or gain strength from forming an alliance.
 Empires
 Empires are widespread states or communities under a single rule. They are characterized by the ruler's desire for unanimous religious affiliation or posing as a threat to other empires in times of war. Empires - such as the Romans, or British - often made considerable progress in ways of democratic structures, creating and building city infrastructures, and maintaining civility within the diverse communities. Because of the intricate organization of the empires, they were often able to hold a large majority of power on a universal level.
 Leagues
 Leagues are international organizations composed of states coming together for a single common purpose. In this way, leagues are different from empires, as they only seek to fulfill a single goal. Often leagues are formed on the brink of a military or economic downfall. Meetings and hearings are conducted in a neutral location with representatives of all involved nations present.

See also 
 Political structure
 Polity
Systems theory in political science
 Tractatus Politicus
 Voting system

Notes

References

Further reading

 Almond, Gabriel A., et al. Comparative Politics Today: A World View (Seventh Edition). 2000. .
 Ferris, Kerry, and Jill Stein. The Real World An Introduction to Sociology. 3rd ed. New York City: W W Norton & Co, 2012. Print.
 "political system". Encyclopædia Britannica. Encyclopædia Britannica Online. Encyclopædia Britannica Inc., 2012. Web. 02 Dec. 2012.

External links 
 Topic guide on political systems at Governance and Social Development Resource Centre

 
Political terminology